Patrick McCarthy (born April 1888 – unknown) was a Welsh footballer. His regular position was as a forward. He was born in Abergavenny. He played for Skelmersdale United, Manchester United, and Chester.

External links
MUFCInfo.com profile

1888 births
Welsh footballers
Skelmersdale United F.C. players
Chester City F.C. players
Manchester United F.C. players
Sportspeople from Abergavenny
Year of death missing
Association football forwards